Jean-Christophe Borlin (born 21 December 1976) is a French former professional rugby league footballer who played for Toulouse Olympique in the Co-operative Championship rugby league competition and for St Gaudens club in the French Rugby League Championship competition. He also had a spell at Championship 1 club Doncaster.

He played on the 2001 tour of New Zealand and Papua New Guinea. He was in the French squad for the 2008 World Cup.

References

1976 births
Living people
Doncaster R.L.F.C. players
Expatriate rugby league players in England
France national rugby league team players
French expatriate rugby league players
French expatriate sportspeople in England
French rugby league players
Place of birth missing (living people)
Rugby articles needing expert attention
Saint-Gaudens Bears players
Toulouse Olympique players
Rugby league props
Rugby league second-rows